Power surge or Powersurge may refer to:
Voltage spike
Power excursion, a nuclear reactor accident
Power Surge (comics), a 2002 DC Comics event
Power Surge (ride), an amusement ride
Power Surge (water ride), a former amusement water ride at Six Flags Fiesta Texas
Powersurge (band), an American power metal band